The canton of Saint-Symphorien-de-Lay is a French former administrative division located in the department of Loire and the Rhône-Alpes region. It was disbanded following the French canton reorganisation which came into effect in March 2015. It had 13,641 inhabitants (2012).

The canton comprised the following communes:

Chirassimont
Cordelle
Croizet-sur-Gand
Fourneaux
Lay
Machézal
Neaux
Neulise
Pradines
Régny 
Saint-Cyr-de-Favières
Saint-Just-la-Pendue
Saint-Priest-la-Roche
Saint-Symphorien-de-Lay
Saint-Victor-sur-Rhins
Vendranges

See also
Cantons of the Loire department

References

Former cantons of Loire (department)
2015 disestablishments in France
States and territories disestablished in 2015